

Noh,
also called Üchang or Wujang
()
is a village in the Rutog County, Ngari Prefecture of the Tibet region of China. It is located on the northern bank of the eastern Pangong Lake (Tso Ngombo), watered by the Doma River (Tsanger-schar). The village is now part of the Domar Township.

Noh is described as a temple town by European travellers. It is the only permanently inhabited place on the northern bank of the Pangong Lake. It is frequently referred to in the British records of the Pangong Lake, but the British (and "foreigners" in general) were not generally allowed to visit it.

Geography 

The state highway S520 called Banying Highway connects Noh with the Khurnak Plain and the Kongka Pass in the Chang Chenmo Valley. The latter is on the Line of Actual Control with India. S520 also connects to the National Highway G219 (Aksai Chin road) in the east.

Current status 
As of 2009, there are 818 people living in the village.
There is also an army base of a border defence company, which is said to have the hard task of defending a long border. According to the Xizang Government, they get along well with each other.

Historical maps

Notes

References

Bibliography 
 
 
 
 

Populated places in Ngari Prefecture
Pangong Lake
Rutog County
Villages in China